John Moroney (24 July 1917 – 1 July 1999) was an Australian cricketer who played in seven Test matches from 1949 to 1951.

Moroney was a solid Australian opening batsman who toured South Africa with success in 1949–50, making his maiden Test century and a second century in the same match. He failed in the First Test of the 1950-51 Ashes series, making a pair, and was dropped even though Australia won by 70 runs and other, more famous, batsmen failed. He was replaced as opener by Ken Archer and played only one more Test the next season against the West Indies.

His highest first-class score was 217, made in five and a half hours, for AR Morris' XI against AL Hassett's XI in 1948–49. However, he had a reputation for slow scoring; R. S. Whitington said he was "like a purposeless porpoise". The Australian cricket writer Johnnie Moyes said, "Moroney was a powerfully-built man who could hit the ball tremendously hard, but he often carried defence to extreme limits", adding that Moroney's fielding also let him down.

He worked as a school teacher.

References

External links
 

1917 births
1999 deaths
Australia Test cricketers
New South Wales cricketers
Australian cricketers
Cricketers from Sydney